Leonius may refer to:
Léonin (fl. 1150s — d. ? 1201), the first known significant composer of polyphonic organum;
the author of a versified Historia Sacra, found in a manuscript of the Bibliothèque Nationale in Paris (see Leonine verse)
the probably apocryphal inventor of Leonine verse, if different from either or both of the preceding two persons
Leonius (Dean of Wells), fl. 1213